
Year 612 (DCXII) was a leap year starting on Saturday (link will display the full calendar) of the Julian calendar. The denomination 612 for this year has been used since the early medieval period, when the Anno Domini calendar era became the prevalent method in Europe for naming years.

Events 
 By place 
 Byzantine Empire 
 August 13 – Empress Eudokia, wife of Heraclius, dies of epilepsy. She leaves two children, and is buried in the Church of the Holy Apostles in Constantinople. 

 Europe 
 King Theudebert II is defeated by his brother Theuderic II at Toul (northeastern France). He is captured in battle and, after having  his royal paraphernalia taken, is handed over to his grandmother Brunhilda. He is put in a monastery, and assassinated with his son Merovech. Theuderic, age 25, becomes sole ruler of Austrasia and Burgundy. 
 Sisebut succeeds Gundemar as king of the Visigoths. He begins a campaign against the remains of Byzantine power in Spania.Roger Collins, "Visigothic Spain 409–711", (Blackwell Publishing, 2004), p. 75

 Asia 
 Goguryeo–Sui War: Emperor Yángdi invades Goguryeo (Korea) with an expeditionary force of over one million men, named the "24 Armies".
 Battle of Salsu: A Sui force of 305,000 men is defeated by the Korean general Eulji Mundeok at the Yalu River; only 2,700 troops survive.

 Mesoamerica 
 October 22 – Sak K'uk' succeeds her father Aj Ne' Yohl Mat, as queen of the Maya state of Palenque (modern Mexico).

 By topic 
 Religion 
 Columbanus moves to Italy and establishes the monastery of Bobbio (approximate date).
 The Holy Sponge is brought to Constantinople from Palestine.
 Arnulf, counselor of Theudebert II, becomes bishop of Metz.
 Gallus founds the monastery of St. Gallen (Switzerland).

Births 
 May 3 – Constantine III, Byzantine emperor (d. 641)
 Aisha, wife of Muhammad (d. 678)
 Germanus of Granfelden, Frankish abbot (approximate date)
 K'ak' Chan Yopaat, king (ajaw) of Copán (approximate date)

 Oswiu, king of Northumbria (approximate date)

Deaths 
 c. February–March – Gundemar, king of the Visigoths
 March 6 – Janaab' Pakal, king of Palenque
 August 13 – Fabia Eudokia, Byzantine empress consort
 Áed Uaridnach, High King of Ireland
 Aj Ne' Yohl Mat, king of Palenque
 Conall Laeg Breg, king of Brega (Ireland)
 Theudebert II, king of Austrasia (b. 586)

References